The Mahsud Waziri blockade was a British campaign against the Mahsud in the British Raj. It began with a passive blockade on 1 December 1900. The British forces were commanded by Major General Charles Egerton. The "most intense" period of fighting began on 23 November 1901. Mobile columns concentrated at Datta Khel, Jandola, Sarwakai and Wana raided Mahsud territory every several weeks, seizing lifestock, taking Mahsud members captive and inflicting heavy casualties. The Mahsud finally surrendered on 10 March 1902.

External links
Official British account of the campaign

References

Conflicts in 1901
Conflicts in 1902
Wars involving British India
Wars involving the United Kingdom